Richard M. K. Saunders (born 1964) is a botanist.

Work 
Among other subjects, his work has focused on the systematics and evolution of Annonaceae, a family of flowering plants.

Legacy 
He is the authority for the following taxa:

Pseuduvaria bruneiensis

Published works
Saunder's books include:

Portraits of Trees of Hong Kong and Southern China (Earnshaw Books, 2019) with Sally Bunker and Chun Chiu Pang

References 

1964 births
Living people
Alumni of the University of St Andrews
Alumni of the University of Reading
Alumni of the University of Portsmouth